Isru Chag refers to the day after each of the Three Pilgrimage Festivals in Judaism: Pesach, Shavuot and Sukkot.

In a responsum to a community that had inquired as to the rationale behind the observance of Isru Chag, Rabbi Yosef Hayyim (1832–1909), known as the Ben Ish Chai, cited the famous Kabbalist Rabbi Isaac Luria (1534–1572), known as the ARI, to the effect that we [Jews] connect the day after the holiday to the holiday itself due to the remaining “light” of the holiday – in other words, so that the sanctity of the holiday will be extended.

Rabbinic authorities cite observances

Adding a degree of festivity to the day as a practice has further been codified in Ashkenazic communities, as Rabbi Moses Isserles (1520–1572), known as the Rema, has stated in his glosses on the Shulchan Aruch (code of Jewish law) in the section of Orach Chayim:

Rabbi Yisrael Meir Kagan (1838–1933), known as the Chofetz Chaim, ruled that the minhag (custom) is to generally forbid fasting on Isru Chag, except in instances when as a result of great distress the community synagogue decrees it.

Almost all communities omit Tachanun (additional prayers of supplication) on Isru Chag. However, communities that follow the rulings of Maimonides (1135–1204), such as the Dor Daim (a movement founded in 19th century Yemen), maintain that the only days on which Tachanun is to be omitted are Shabbat, Yom Tov, Rosh HaShanah, Rosh Chodesh, Chanukah, Purim, and the Mincha on the eve of any Shabbat and Yom Tov.

See also
 Chol HaMoed, the intermediate days of Passover and Sukkot.
 Mimouna, a traditional North African Jewish celebration held the day after Passover.
 Pesach Sheni, is exactly one month after 14 Nisan.
 Purim Katan is when during a Jewish leap year Purim is celebrated during Adar II so that the 14th of Adar I is then called Purim Katan.
 Shushan Purim falls on Adar 15 and is the day on which Jews in Jerusalem celebrate Purim.
 Yom Kippur Katan is a practice observed by some Jews on the day preceding each Rosh Chodesh or New-Moon Day.
 Yom tov sheni shel galuyot refers to the observance of an extra day of Jewish holidays outside of the land of Israel.

References

External links
What is Isru Chag? 
"Holiday Wrapping"
Isru Chag
The Morning After 
Understanding Isru Chag and Yemei Tashlumin

Hebrew names of Jewish holy days
Minor Jewish holidays
Nisan observances
Passover
Shavuot
Shemini Atzeret
Sukkot
Tishrei observances
Hebrew words and phrases in Jewish law